The King-Remick was a brass era automobile built in Detroit, Michigan, in 1910.

History 
The  Autoparts Manufacturing Company built  for King-Remick a two-seat roadster. It was claimed this "gives perfect distribution of the load". Probably only the prototype was built.

References

Sources
Clymer, Floyd. Treasury of Early American Automobiles, 1877-1925. New York: Bonanza Books, 1950.
G.N. Georgano The Complete Encyclopedia of Motorcars, 1885 to Present. 1968.

Brass Era vehicles
Cars introduced in 1910

Defunct motor vehicle manufacturers of the United States
1910s cars